The following is a list of lottery games(including the United States and Canada) in which five regular numbers are drawn from a larger set of numbers. The list includes the name, the number field for each, and the frequency of drawings. All pick-5 games in the U.S. and Canada are drawn multiple times per week(usually nightly, including Sundays and holidays); some lotteries now hold such drawings more than once a day.

Most U.S. pick-5 games now have a progressive jackpot, even in games that are drawn daily; in unusual cases, a single ticket has won a cash prize in excess of $1 million cash. A common top prize in non-jackpot pick-5 games is $100,000(In the lists below, games with a jackpot do not have a minimum jackpot listed.). Depending on the game, a minimum of either two or three numbers(not counting a "bonus ball") must be matched for a winning ticket(A 2/5 match usually results in a free play for that game, or a "break-even" win; for the latter, the player wins back their stake on that particular five-number wager.). Prize payouts depending on the game are either fixed(with parimutuel exceptions), are always parimutuel, or feature a parimutuel jackpot with fixed lower-tier prizes.

With very few exceptions, all U.S. and Canadian games where five regular numbers are drawn from the same pool have had a lump sum jackpot/grand prize, hence the word Cash is used as part of the name of several such games.

Except where noted, all current pick-5 games listed here cost $1 per play. Some pick-5 games have introduced an add-on wager, usually $1, either as an "instant match" feature, or, as in the additional 50-cent Connecticut Cash 5 wager Kicker, to give a player additional prize levels. An increasingly popular style of pick-5 game is based on Caribbean stud poker; such games combine a "traditional" drawing with an instant-win feature.

The lists do not include "4+1" games, such as Florida's Lucky Money, where all five numbers must be matched to win the top prize, but are drawn from two number fields(A similar game, Montana's "Big Sky Bonus", is actually a "four-number" game; the double matrix is 4/31 + 1/16(previously was 4/28 + 1/17). Matching all four "regular" numbers wins the jackpot; matching the "bonus" ball wins $10 plus any money won for matching at least two of the four "regular" numbers.).

DC-5, Florida's Pick 5, Georgia Five, Louisiana's Pick 5, Maryland's Pick 5, Ohio's Pick 5, and Pennsylvania's Pick 5 also do not truly fit this category, as they are five-digit numbers games with "straight" and "box" wagers played like many U.S. pick-3 and pick-4 games.

U.S. pick-5 games

Multi-jurisdictional 
 Tri-State Lottery(Maine, New Hampshire, Vermont) Gimme5 (39 numbers; Monday to Friday)

Single-jurisdictional
 Arizona Fantasy 5 (41 numbers, daily except Sunday)
 California Fantasy 5 (39 numbers, daily)
 Colorado Cash 5 (32 numbers, daily)
 Connecticut Cash5 (35 numbers, night drawings)
 Florida Fantasy 5 (36 numbers, daily)
 Georgia Fantasy 5 (42 numbers, daily)
 Idaho 5 Star Draw (45 numbers, 2 plays/$5, Tuesday & Friday); Idaho Ca$h (45 numbers, 2 plays/$1, daily); Weekly Grand (32 numbers, daily)
 Illinois Lucky Day Lotto (45 numbers, twice daily)
 Indiana Cash 5 (45 numbers, daily)
 Kentucky Kentucky 5 (39 numbers, daily)
 Louisiana Easy 5 (37 numbers, daily)
 Maine World Poker Tour (52 cards, daily)
 Maryland Bonus Match 5 (39 numbers, daily)
 Massachusetts Mass Cash (35 numbers, daily)
 Michigan Fantasy 5 (39 numbers, daily); Poker Lotto (52 cards; daily)
 Minnesota Gopher 5 (47 numbers, Monday, Wednesday, & Friday); North 5 (31 numbers, daily)
 Mississippi Match 5 (35 number, Tuesday, Thursday, & Saturday)
 Missouri Show Me Ca$h (39 numbers, daily)
 Montana Montana Cash (45 numbers, 2 plays/$1, Wednesday & Saturday)
 Nebraska Pick 5 (38 numbers, daily)
 New Jersey Jersey Cash 5 (45 numbers, daily)
 New Mexico Roadrunner Cash (37 numbers, daily)
 New York Take 5 (39 numbers, twice daily)
 North Carolina Carolina Cash 5 (43 numbers, daily)
 Ohio Rolling Cash 5 (39 numbers, daily)
 Oklahoma Cash 5 (36 numbers, daily)
 Pennsylvania Cash 5 (43 numbers, daily evening drawings); Treasure Hunt (30 numbers, daily midday drawings)
 Rhode Island Wild Money (38 numbers, daily)
 South Carolina Palmetto Cash 5 (38 numbers, daily)
 South Dakota Dakota Cash (35 numbers, Wednesday & Saturday)
 Tennessee Daily Tennessee Jackpot (38 numbers, daily)
 Texas Cash Five (35 numbers; daily except Sunday)
 Virginia Cash 5 (41 numbers, daily)
 Washington Hit 5 (42 numbers, daily)
 Wisconsin Badger 5 (31 numbers, daily)
 Wyoming Cowboy Draw (45 numbers, 2 plays/$5, Mondays & Thursdays)

Current Canadian pick-5 games
 Atlantic Lottery Corporation Bucko! (41 numbers, daily); Poker Lotto (52 cards, daily)
 British Columbia Poker Lotto (52 cards, daily)
 Ontario Poker Lotto (52 cards, daily)
 Quebec Triplex (41 numbers, daily); Lotto Poker (52 cards; daily); Sprinto (50 numbers, daily)
 Wester Canada Poker Lotto (52 cards, daily)

Other 

 Mexico: Chispazo (28 Numbers; Twice daily)
 Russia: Sportloto 5 to 36 (36 Numbers + 1 out of 4 bonus balls; Every 30 minutes)
 South Africa: Daily Lotto (36 Numbers; Daily)
 United Kingdom Thunderball (39 Numbers + 1 out of 14 bonus balls; Every Tuesday, Wednesday, Friday and Saturday)

See also
Six-number lottery game

References

Lotteries
Lotteries in the United States
Lotteries in Canada

be:Лятарэя
de:Lotto
es:Lotería
eo:Loterio
fr:Loterie
is:Getraun
nl:Loterij
ja:宝くじ
fi:Lotto
sv:Lotto
zh:博彩